Las Hermanas is a Philippine television drama series broadcast by GMA Network. Directed by Monti Puno Parungao, it stars Yasmien Kurdi, Thea Tolentino and Faith Da Silva. It premiered on October 25, 2021 on the network's Afternoon Prime line up replacing Nagbabagang Luha. The series concluded on January 14, 2022 with a total of 60 episodes. It was replaced by Prima Donnas in its timeslot.

The series is streaming online on YouTube.

Cast and characters

Lead cast
 Yasmien Kurdi as Dorothy Manansala
 Thea Tolentino as Minerva "Minnie" Manansala
 Faith Da Silva as Scarlet Manansala / Carla Illustre

Supporting cast
 Albert Martinez as Lorenzo Illustre
 Jason Abalos as Gabriel Lucero
 Lucho Ayala as Ronald de Guzman
 Jennica Garcia as Brenda Macario
 Madeleine Nicolas as Josefa Manansala
 Rubi Rubi as Rowena Mallari / Ellen "Lady E" Torillo
 Melissa Mendez as Divine Sarmiento
 Robert Ortega as Berto Macario
 Paolo Serrano as Gerald Kau
 Orlando Sol as Franco Francisco
 Coleen Paz as Kiwi Almeda

Guest cast
 Rita Avila as Mildred Manansala
 Leandro Baldemor as Fernando Manansala
 Gabrielle Hahn as Host

Production
Principal photography commenced in May 2021.

Episodes

Ratings
According to AGB Nielsen Philippines' Nationwide Urban Television Audience Measurement People in television homes, the pilot episode of Las Hermanas earned a 6.1% rating.

References

External links
 
 

2021 Philippine television series debuts
2022 Philippine television series endings
Filipino-language television shows
GMA Network drama series
Television shows set in the Philippines